Nicola Miceli (born 28 May 1971) is an Italian former professional racing cyclist. He rode in five editions of the Giro d'Italia.

References

External links
 

1971 births
Living people
People from Desio
Italian male cyclists
Cyclists from the Province of Monza e Brianza